The Hundred with Andy Lee is an Australian comedy panel television game show hosted by Andy Lee and starring Mike Goldstein.

Format
Andy Lee poses questions to three guest panellists, who battle it out to determine who knows Australia best. "The Hundred" are 100 Australians, picked to represent the demographic make-up of Australia, who join in from around the country via Zoom and appear on a giant screen. They are polled live to give a statistical view of the nation, while the three panellists analyse the question and share their own experiences. Special guests also appear in one segment to pose their own questions.

Production
The first series was filmed in Sydney for 2021 due to COVID-19 restrictions and from the second series, the show was filmed in Melbourne.

Episodes

Series 1 (2021)

Series 2 (Early 2022)

Series 3 (Late 2022)

Series 4 (2023)

Specials

Notes

Greek version
The Hundred was produced in Greece which has to be advised.

References

Nine Network original programming
Australian panel games
2021 Australian television series debuts
2020s Australian comedy television series
2020s Australian game shows
English-language television shows
Television series by Screentime
Television shows set in Sydney
Television shows set in Melbourne